Sir Winston Churchill Collegiate & Vocational Institute was a high school in Thunder Bay, Ontario. It was part of the Lakehead District School Board system. The school was opened in 1966 and had between 1,100 and 1,500 students enrolled. While students began attending in the fall of '66 the building wasn't actually ready until just before Christmas of that year. Students enrolled in Sir Winston Churchill attended classes in the morning only at nearby Northwood Technical school while Northwood students attended in the afternoon. The school was commonly referred to by the shorter name of SWC. The school is the only one in the city which at one time had a pool, which was later sold to the city. SWC was known for its amazing academics and sport teams. During their last year of football, the senior boys won city championship.

The school was closed in 2018, to be demolished. The former football field will hold an elementary school with students from both French immersion school Agnew and English school Edgewater. The land which Churchill was on will hold the elementary school playground. The Board has decided on keeping the SWC sign as a memorial.

Sir Winston Churchill Collegiate & Vocational Institute was the only school in Thunder Bay that offered the internationally recognized and academically challenging International Baccalaureate Program. The program moved to Superior CVI along with the IB students. The rest of the students were transferred to Westgate CVI.

Sir Winston Churchill was also the only high school in the board to provide grades 7–12 education in the Lakehead Board. The HUB program was made to compete with the Catholic board. All the rest are restricted to grades 9–12.

See also
List of high schools in Ontario

References

External links
 Sir Winston Churchill C.V.I. (archived copy)

High schools in Thunder Bay
International Baccalaureate schools in Ontario
1966 establishments in Ontario
2018 disestablishments in Ontario
Educational institutions established in 1966
Educational institutions disestablished in 2018